Calaveras Creek is a northward-flowing stream in Alameda and Santa Clara counties of California.

Its main tributary is Arroyo Hondo.

Ecology
Calaveras Dam, built by the Spring Valley Water Company in 1925, was re-built in 2018.

See also
 List of watercourses in the San Francisco Bay Area

References

Rivers of Alameda County, California
Rivers of Santa Clara County, California
Rivers of Northern California
Tributaries of Alameda Creek